Makabayang Koalisyon ng Mamamayan (Makabayan) is a coalition of twelve party-lists in the House of Representatives of the Philippines. It was founded on April 16, 2009. The founding assembly was held at UP Theatre, Diliman, Quezon City.

Party-lists 

Thirteen party-lists are part of Makabayan:

 Bayan Muna
 Teachers: Alliance of Concerned Teachers
 Workers and peasants: Anakpawis
 Women: GABRIELA (General Assembly Binding Women for Integrity, Reform, Equality, Leadership and Action) Women's party
 Youth: Kabataan
 Indigenous people: Katribu
 Migrants: Migrante
 Children's rights: Akap-bata
 Government employees: COURAGE (Confederation for Unity Recognition and Advancement of Government Employees)
 Drivers: Piston
 Green party: Kalikasan
 Bicolano people: Aking Bikolnon
 Moro people: Suara Bangsamoro
In 2016, the Commission on Elections disqualified the Akap Bata and Katribu partylists for failure to acquire the necessary votes.

Coalition 
Makabayan also includes organizations that are not political parties, including:

Peasants: Kilusang Magbubukid ng Pilipinas (Peasant Movement in the Philippines, KMP), AMIHAN (National Federation of Peasant Women: Defend Peasant Women Portraits Series), UMA (Unyon ng mga Manggagawa sa Agrikultura, Union of Agricultural Workers)
Workers: Kilusang Mayo Uno (May First Movement, KMU)
Youth and Students: Anakbayan, College Editors Guild of the Philippines (CEGP), League of Filipino Students (LFS), National Union of Students of the Philippines (NUSP), Karatula – Kabataang Artista para sa Tunay na Kalayaan (Youth Artists for Genuine Freedom), SCMP – Student Christian Movement of the Philippines
Fisherfolk: Pambasang Lakas ng Kilusang Mamamalakaya Pilipinas (National Force of Fisherfolk Movement in the Philippines, PAMALAKAYA)
Religious: Promotion of Church People's Response (PCPR), Rural Missionaries of the Philippines (RMP)
Health Workers: Health Alliance for Democracy (HEAD)
Scientists: Agham-  Advocates of Science and Technology for the People
Teachers: Congress of Teachers and Educators for Nationalism and Democracy (CONTEND)
Cultural Workers: Concerned Artists of the Philippines (CAP), Sinagbayan, Tambisan sa Sining
Indigenous People: Kalipunan ng mga Katutubong Mamamayan ng Pilipinas (KAMP)
Human Rights Defenders: KARAPATAN – Alliance for the Advancement of People's Rights
Lawyers: National Union of People's Lawyers (NUPL)
Urban poor: Kalipunan ng Damayang Mahihirap (KADAMAY)

Electoral performance

President

Vice president

Senate

House of Representatives

References 

Left-wing politics in the Philippines
National Democracy Movement (Philippines)
Political party alliances in the Philippines
Political parties established in 1985
Political parties established in 2009
Socialist parties in the Philippines
1985 establishments in the Philippines